Mortality factor 4-like protein 2 is a protein that in humans is encoded by the MORF4L2 gene.

References

Further reading